A Man's Game is a 1934 American drama film directed by D. Ross Lederman. Released by Columbia Pictures, the film stars Tim McCoy, Evalyn Knapp and Ward Bond.

Plot
A pair of firemen and friends, Tim Bradley and Dave Jordan, are both attracted to court stenographer Judy Manners after a rescue from a fire. Judy, involved against her will in an embezzlement scheme, ends up starting a fire to chase away the embezzlers as the guy try to save her from both the flames and the crooks.

Cast
 Tim McCoy as Tim Bradley
 Evalyn Knapp as Judy Manners
 Ward Bond as Dave Jordan
 DeWitt Jennings as Chief Jordan (as De Witt Jennings)
 Stephen Chase as Kelton (as Alden Chase)
 John Dilson as John T. Bradley
 Wade Boteler as Captain O'Hara
 Nick Copeland as T.W. Jackson
 Bob Kortman as Kane
 Edward LeSaint as Judge (uncredited)

References

External links
 
 

1934 films
1934 drama films
American drama films
American black-and-white films
1930s English-language films
Films directed by D. Ross Lederman
Columbia Pictures films
1930s American films